Thestor strutti, the Strutt's skolly, is a species of butterfly in the family Lycaenidae. It is endemic to South Africa, where it is only known from sparse fynbos on the high slopes near the north end of the Bainskloof Pass near Wolseley in the Western Cape.

The wingspan is 25–27 mm for males and 26–28 mm for females. Adults are on wing from late July or August to early September. There is one generation per year.

Sources

Thestor
Butterflies described in 1951
Endemic butterflies of South Africa
Taxonomy articles created by Polbot